Pierre Thomas, sieur du Fossé (1634–1698) was a French scholar and author, and was the son of a master of accounts at Rouen. He was sent as a child to be educated to the Jansenists at Port-Royal des Champs. There he received his bent towards the life of a recluse, and even of a hermit, which drew him to establish himself in the neighborhood of Port-Royal des Champs. There he associated with Louis-Sébastien Le Nain de Tillemont, Antoine Singlin, Robert Arnauld d'Andilly and Antoine Le Maistre.

In 1661 he came to Paris, and in 1666 was arrested along with Louis-Isaac Lemaistre de Sacy, and after a month in the Bastille was exiled to his estate of Fossé near Forges-les-Eaux. He later made yearly visits to Paris during the winter months. Apart from his collaboration with de Sacy on a French translation of the Bible, Thomas wrote some hagiographic works and left Mémoires (1697–1698 and again 1876–1879), which are highly praised by Sainte-Beuve as being a remarkable mirror of the life at Port-Royal.

He also wrote under the pseudonymes Pierre Thomas Beaulieu and Pierre Thomas La Motte.

Notes

References
Pierre Thomas du Fossé at the French Wikipedia (visited March 16, 2009)
Attribution

1634 births
1698 deaths
French scholars
French memoirists
Jansenists
Writers from Rouen
French male non-fiction writers
17th-century memoirists